Innovation in Malaysia describes trends and developments in innovation in Malaysia.

In 2015, the Najib Razak coalition government estimated that 6% annual growth would be necessary to reach high-income status by 2020. It's more than the average for the previous decade and average for 2016-2019(4.8%), according to the World Bank.

Malaysia's National Transformation Policy 2050 (2017) assigned a greater role than previously to science and technology in all sectors and mandated a shift towards the use of ‘green’ energy, such as solar, biomass and wind, to drive the country's economic transformation to 2050. To deliver this agenda, the government developed an action plan for science, technology, engineering, mathematics (STEM) and medicine as part of its 2018 budget. The incoming administration in 2018 did not change this overall policy direction. Since 2018, the administration has acted on its predecessor’s recommendations to raise the number of students enrolled in STEM courses and foster uptake of Industry 4.0 technologies like nanotechnology. Over 2016–2019, the direct contribution of nanotechnology to the economy was estimated at MYR 3.5 billion (ca US$ 800 million). The volume of scientific publications on nanotechnology rose by 14% over the 2012–2019 period. Malaysia contributed 0.64% of global output in this field in 2011 and 0.67% in 2019.

Contribution of research and innovation to development

Trends in research investment 
Between 2008 and 2012, research spending rose from 0.79% to 1.13% of GDP. GDP grew steadily over the same period. Malaysia plans to raise this ratio to 2% of GDP by 2020.  One in five (22%) of Malaysian researchers worked in the business enterprise sector in 2016, according to the same source.

Although research spending increased to 1.44% of GDP in 2016, the government has since trimmed or eliminated several funding schemes, including the Long Term Research Grant Scheme, the Transcendental Research Grant Scheme and the Fundamental Research Grant Scheme for universities.

In February 2021, the Ministry of Science, Technology and Innovation launched the Malaysia Grand Challenge to encourage disruptive innovation and reduce reliance on foreign technologies. This body allocates funds to start-ups and SMEs through the following five new mechanisms to help them commercialize their products and services: the Strategic Research Fund, Technology Development Funds 1 and 2 (TeD 1 and TeD 2), a Bridging Fund and an Applied Innovation Fund (Yunus).

Research trends in the business sector 
Research and development (R&D) are conducted predominantly in large-scale enterprises in the electronics, automotive and chemical industries. Small and medium-sized enterprises, which make up 97% of all private firms, contribute little. This is because most of the small and medium-sized enterprises that work as subcontractors for multinational firms have remained confined to the role of original equipment manufacturers. In order to help these small and medium-sized enterprises  (SMEs) access the requisite knowledge, skills and finance that will enable them to participate in original design and original brand manufacturing, the government has adopted a strategy of connecting SMEs to the incubation facilities in the country's numerous science and technology parks.

Foreign multinational firms are generally engaged in more sophisticated R&D than national firms. However, even the R&D conducted by foreign firms tends to be confined to process and product improvements, rather than pushing back the international technology frontier. Moreover, foreign multinationals are heavily dependent on their parent and subsidiary firms based outside Malaysia for personnel, owing to the lack of qualified human capital and research universities within Malaysia to call upon.

A group of ten multinationals have decided to address these shortcomings. In order to satisfy the research needs of the electrical and electronics industries, which employ nearly 5 000 research scientists and engineers in Malaysia, Agilent Technologies, Intel, Motorola Solutions, Silterra and six other multinationals established a platform in 2012 to promote Collaborative Research in Engineering, Science and Technology (CREST) among industry, academia and the government. These multinational firms generate close to MYR 25 billion (circa US$6.9 billion) in annual revenue and spend nearly MYR 1.4 billion on research and development. They utilized government research grants extensively since the government decided in 2005 to extend these grants beyond domestic firms to multinational beneficiaries. Besides research, the focus has been on talent development, the ultimate aim being to help the industry add greater value to its products.

A total of RYM 1.1 billion (ca US$ 270 million) was allocated in the 2020 budget to five economic corridors to support projects such as the Chuping Valley Industrial Area and Kuantan Port.

Challenges for high-tech industries 
Since the launch of export-oriented industrialization in 1971, multinational corporations have relocated to Malaysia, fuelling a rapid expansion in manufactured exports that has helped turn the country into one of the world's leading exporters of electrical and electronic goods. Today, Malaysia is highly integrated in global trade, with manufacturing contributing over 60% of its exports. Half of these exports (49%) were destined for the East Asian market in 2010, compared to just 29% in 1980. The main destinations in East Asia are China, Indonesia, the Republic of Korea, Philippines, Singapore and Thailand. In 2013, Malaysia accounted for 6.6% of world exports of integrated circuits and other electronic components, according to the World Trade Organization.

Over the past 15 years or so, the share of manufacturing in GDP has gradually declined as a natural consequence of the concomitant growth in services as a corollary of greater development. Modern manufacturing and services are deeply intertwined, as high-tech industries often have a massive services component. The development of the services sector is thus not, in itself, a cause for concern.

High-tech manufacturing has stagnated in absolute terms in recent years and its share of global added value has slipped from 0.8% in 2007 to 0.6% in 2013. Over the same period, Malaysia's global share of high-tech exports (goods and services) contracted from 4.6% to 3.5%, according to the World Trade Organization. The contribution of high-tech industries to national GDP has likewise dropped. This suggests that the shift towards services has neglected the development of high-tech services. Moreover, although the volume of manufacturing has not declined, less value is being added to manufactured goods than before. As a consequence, Malaysia's trade surplus declined from 144 529 ringgits (MYR) in 2009 to MYR 91 539 in 2013 and Malaysia has been losing ground in high-tech exports. This means that Malaysian high-tech industries are contributing much less to manufactured exports than they did a decade ago. Even though patent applications with the Malaysian patent office have increased steadily over the years, there still seems to be little return on investment in R&D. Domestic applications also seem to be of lower quality than those of foreign applicants, with a cumulative grants-to-application ratio of 18% between 1989 and 2014, against 53% for foreign applicants over the same period.

In addition, academic or public research organizations in Malaysia appear to have a limited ability to translate research into intellectual property rights. The Malaysian Institute of Micro-electronic Systems, Malaysia's forefront public R&D institute, which was corporatized in 1992, contributed 45–50% of Malaysia's patents filed in 2010 but the low citations that have emerged from those patents suggest that the commercialization rate is low.

Rate of return on research 
While discovery and patenting are crucial for Malaysia's export-oriented competitiveness and growth strategy, there still seems to be little return on investment in research and development. The low commercialization rate can largely be attributed to a lack of university–industry collaboration, rigidities in research organizations and problems with co-ordinating policies. Universities seem to confine the commercialization of their research results to specific areas, such as health and information and communication technologies. In 2010, the government established the Malaysian Innovation Agency to spur the commercialization of research.

Five years after its inception, the Malaysian Innovation Agency had made a limited impact on commercialization thus far, owing to the unclear delineation of its role in relation to the Ministry of Science, Technology and Innovation and the agency's limited resources. Nevertheless, there is some evidence to suggest that the agency is beginning to play a catalytic role in driving commercialization and an innovative culture, especially as regards innovation beyond the hardware industry, which is where firms offering services, such as airline services, are active.

One public–private funding model involves the Malaysian Palm Oil Board, a public body born of the merger of the Palm Oil Research Institute of Malaysia and the Palm Oil Registration and Licensing Authority in 2000, by act of parliament. Through a tax levied on every tonne of palm oil and palm kernel oil produced in the country, the oil palm industry funds many of the research grants provided by the Malaysian Palm Oil Board. These grants amounted to MYR 2.04 billion (circa US$565 million) between 2000 and 2010. The Malaysian Palm Oil Board supports innovation in areas such as biodiesel and alternate uses for palm biomass and organic waste. Its research into biomass has led to the development of wood and paper products, fertilizers, bio-energy sources, polyethylene sheeting for use in vehicles and other products made of palm biomass.

Development of endogenous research 
The government is keen to develop endogenous research, in order to reduce the country's reliance on industrial research undertaken by foreign multinational companies. By financing graduate study, the government helped to double enrolment in PhD programmes between 2007 and 2010 to 22,000. It has also introduced incentives to encourage expatriates to return to Malaysia through the Returning Expert Programme and plans to become the sixth-largest destination for international university students by 2020. It is hoped that the creation of the ASEAN Economic Community in 2015 will encourage scientific co-operation among member countries.

The creation of these research universities resulted from the government's higher education strategy of 2006. A parallel goal of the strategy was to raise government spending on higher education.  By financing graduate students, for instance, the government doubled enrolment in doctoral programmes between 2007 and 2010. According to the UNESCO Institute for Statistics, the number of full-time equivalent (FTE) researchers in Malaysia tripled between 2008 and 2012 (from 16,345 to 52,052), carrying the researcher density to 1 780 per million inhabitants in 2012, which was well above the global average for 2013 (1,083 per million).By 2016, there were 2,397 researchers per million inhabitants in Malaysia, almost double the global average (1,368 per million).

Introducing a requirement for universities to collaborate with industry would be a means of supporting the commercialization of research results to boost the country's innovation performance.

Digital innovation policy

Transforming manufacturing and related service industries 
The Ministry of International Trade and Industry published its Industry4WRD: National Policy on Industry 4.0 in 2018. This policy sets out to use digitalization to transform Malaysia’s manufacturing sector and related service industries. One goal is to adopt smart manufacturing. Targets include raising labour productivity by 30% over 2016–2025; raising the value of the manufacturing sector from about US$ 58 billion to US$ 90 billion; and expanding the share of highly skilled workers in the manufacturing workforce from 18% to 35%. One notable initiative is the Smart Manufacturing Experience Centre, announced in mid-2020 by the Standard and Industrial Research Institute of Malaysia. Launched in 2021, the centre supports SMEs in developing their strategies and capacities for Industry 4.0, by providing access to existing platforms and technologies. In this way, it should provide a ‘test bed’ for companies to trial their innovations. The centre will also train institutes of higher learning, as well as the private sector, in applications of Industry 4.0 technologies.

In July 2020, the Malaysia Digital Economy Corporation launched the Smart Automation Grant to help firms digitalize their business processes. This matching grant targets firms in the services sector, including wholesale and retail, which pay at least half of the total cost of their digitalization project. In February 2021, 66 SMEs and mid-tier firms in traditional sectors such as tourism, real estate, education, and healthcare system were awarded the Smart Automation Grant as part of Malaysian government’s National Economic Recovery Plan (Penjana) in the wake of 2020-21 political crisis and COVID-19 pandemic.

Malaysia’s 2020 budget introduced instruments to boost the e-commerce, such as an e-wallet and cashless payment system (Govt of Malaysia, 2019b). A strategy on AI was reportedly under the development in 2021.

Innovation to tackle sustainability challenges 

Since about 2010, policy debates have centred on the need to address factors such as low farm productivity, increasing health-related problems, natural disasters, environmental problems and monetary inflation. In 2014, the government launched transdisciplinary research grants with the objective of including societal benefits among the performance criteria at Malaysia's research universities and providing incentives to promote science in support of poverty alleviation and sustainable development.

On 16 November 2016, Malaysia ratified the Paris Agreement. According to the World Resources Institute, Malaysia contributed about 0.9% of global greenhouse gas emissions in 2012, taking into account land-use changes and forestry. 'Although Malaysia remains committed to reducing its carbon emissions by 40% by 2020 over 2012 levels, as pledged by the Malaysian prime minister at the climate summit in Warsaw in 2013, it faces growing sustainability challenges’. For instance, in January 2014, Selangor, the most developed of Malaysia's federated states, experienced water shortages. These were caused by high pollution levels and the drying of reservoirs as a consequence of overuse. Land clearing and deforestation are still major concerns, due to landslides and population displacements. Malaysia is the world's second-biggest producer of palm oil.

Palm oil exports represent the third-largest category of Malaysian exports after fossil fuels (petroleum and gas) and electronics. Approximately 58% of Malaysia was forested in 2010. With the government having committed to preserving at least half of all land as primary forest, Malaysia has little latitude to expand the extent of land already under cultivation. Rather, it will need to focus on improving productivity. This will necessitate innovation.

The four out of ten Malaysians in the lowest income bracket are also increasingly exposed to social and environmental risks. The incidence of dengue increased by 90% in 2013 over the previous year, for instance, with 39,222 recorded cases, in a trend which may be linked to deforestation and/or climate change.

Over 2018–2020, the government launched four large-scale solar projects with capacity of 500–1 228 MW, two of which were operational by 2020. Contractors hired as part of all three projects were bound to include at least one national player. In 2019, the Sustainability Energy Development Authority began implementing the MySuria programme with the intention of installing 3-kW solar photovoltaic systems in 1 620 households from the bottom-40% income group.

In 2018, the government launched a campaign to eliminate the use of plastics and actively support the recycling of biowaste. The government also committed to reviewing the construction of new dams, owing to environmental concerns.

Sources

See also
Economy of Malaysia

References 

Economy of Malaysia
Malaysia